Wawan Febrianto (born 23 February 1994) is an Indonesian professional footballer who plays as a winger for Liga 1 club PSIS Semarang. He is also a Second Sergeant in the Indonesian Army.

Club career

Youth 
He was part of Deportivo Indonesia and Pelita Bandung Raya U21.

Pelita Bandung Raya 
He was promoted from the youth team to the senior squad for the 2014 Indonesia Super League season. He scored his first professional goal in a 4–1 win against Gresik United on 26 May 2014, scoring the fourth goal in injury time.

PSIS Semarang 
PSIS Semarang management officially recruited Wawan Febrianto from Borneo Samarinda with a transfer system. This is because the player in question still has a one-season contract with the club nicknamed Pesut Etam.

International career
He made his debut for the Indonesia in the 2022 FIFA World Cup qualification against Vietnam on 15 October 2019.

Career statistics

Club

International

International goals 
Scores and results list the Indonesia's goal tally first.
Indonesia U-23

References

External links 
 
 

1994 births
Living people
People from Pati Regency
Indonesian footballers
Indonesia youth international footballers
Indonesia international footballers
Liga 1 (Indonesia) players
Pelita Bandung Raya players
Persikabo 1973 players
Borneo F.C. players
PSIS Semarang players
Sportspeople from Central Java
Association football midfielders
21st-century Indonesian people